An Islamist is a person who holds a set of political ideologies holding that Islam is not only a religion but also a political system.

Islamist may also refer to:

 The Islamist, a 2007 book by Ed Husain

See also
 
 Islam (disambiguation)